Enchanted Rocks Preserve is a Wildlands Conservancy nature preserve consisting of  of land in Jefferson County, Oregon, northwest of Mitchell. It has a section of the National Wild and Scenic John Day River.

Recreation

Geography
Preserve includes two miles of John Day River and 17 miles of Cherry Creek.

Flora and Fauna
Wildlife includes Rocky Mountain elk, bald eagles and beavers.

History
In 2022, the Cherry Creek Ranch was acquired becoming the first Wildlands Conservancy preserve in Oregon.

References

Nature reserves in Oregon
Protected areas of Jefferson County, Oregon